Bouchaib Rmail (born 1951 in Sidi Bennour Province)  used to be director of the DGSN (Direction Général de Sûreté Nationale). He assumed this position in February 2012 replacing Charki Draiss.

In 2004 he obtained a doctorate from Sidi Mohamed Ben Abdellah University of Fes.

Previous positions
Commissaire in Mohammedia 1981–1993
Chef de Sûreté Hay Mohammadi-Ain Sebaa 1993–1997
Chef de Sûreté régionale Fes 1997–2000
Préfet de Police de Casablanca 2000–2004
Directeur de la Sécurité Public in the DGSN: 2005–2006
Préfet de Police de Laayoune 2006–November 2010
Wali of Mediouna, Morocco November 2010–February 2012

Source:

References

1948 births
Moroccan police officers
Living people
People from Sidi Bennour
Moroccan civil servants
Sidi Mohamed Ben Abdellah University alumni